Torre de Coelheiros is a parish within the municipality of Évora, in the Alentejo region, with 226,24 km² and 539 inhabitants (2021). Its population density is 2,4 hab/km².

Former domain of the Cogominhos, the parish also known as Nossa Senhora do Rosário, was established in 1535, upon request by Nuno Fernandes Cogominho.

It lost most of its population to emigration in the 60's and 70's, especially to Switzerland. 

Its main landmarks are the montado landscape, the Paço dos Cogominhos, the church of Nossa Senhora do Rosário and Pelourinho. Currently the parish of Torre de Coelheiros also encompasses the extinguished parishes of São Bento de Pomares, São Jordão e São Marcos da Abóbada. Outside the village lies also the abandoned churches of São Bento de Pomares and São Jordão.

Population

Historic landmarks 

 Anta da Herdade da Murteira
 Anta da Herdade da Tisnada
 Castelo de Torre de Coelheiros

References 

Geography of Portugal